Pawnee State Recreation Area (SRA) is a state recreation area in southeastern Nebraska, United States. The recreation area is managed by the Nebraska Game and Parks Commission. Pawnee Lake is the second largest of the Salt Valley Lakes.

In more recent years, swimming has been prohibited at times because of toxic algae.

External links
Official Webpage
2004 Lincoln Journal Star Article about Algae sickness
Lincoln Journal Star article about the 2005 closure to swimmers

Protected areas of Lancaster County, Nebraska
State parks of Nebraska